The following television stations operate on virtual channel 50 in the United States:

 K29NN-D in Lucerne Valley, California
 K33OB-D in Roswell, New Mexico
 K33OK-D in Overton, Nevada
 K36KW-D in Redwood Falls, Minnesota
 KASY-TV in Albuquerque, New Mexico
 KBAB-LD in Santa Barbara, California
 KDHU-LD in Houston, Texas
 KDOS-LD in Globe, Arizona
 KDVD-LD in Globe, Arizona
 KEJT-CD in Salt Lake City, Utah
 KEMO-TV in Santa Rosa, California
 KJLN-LD in Joplin, Missouri
 KKAI in Kailua, Hawaii
 KLSV-LD in Las Vegas, Nevada
 KLWB in New Iberia, Louisiana
 KOCE-TV in Huntington Beach, California
 KOPS-LD in Beaumont, Texas
 KPSE-LD in Palm Springs, California
 KPXE-TV in Kansas City, Missouri
 KRMV-LD in Riverside, California
 KSDY-LD in San Diego, California
 KTCJ-LD in Minneapolis, Minnesota
 KTFD-TV in Denver, Colorado
 KTGF-LD in Great Falls, Montana
 WASV-LD in Asheville, North Carolina
 WBNM-LD in Louisville, Kentucky
 WDCW in Washington, D.C.
 WHOB-LD in Buxton, North Carolina
 WKBD-TV in Detroit, Michigan
 WKDC-LD in Columbia, South Carolina
 WNGS-LD in Greenville, South Carolina
 WNJN in Montclair, New Jersey
 WOKZ-CD in Kalamazoo, Michigan
 WPGA-LD in Macon, Georgia
 WPGD-TV in Hendersonville, Tennessee
 WPWR-TV in Gary, Indiana
 WPXB-LD in Daytona Beach, Florida
 WPXX-TV in Memphis, Tennessee
 WQHA in Aguada, Puerto Rico
 WRAZ in Raleigh, North Carolina
 WRDM-CD in Hartford, Connecticut
 WRUG-LD in Baton Rouge, Louisiana
 WTOO-CD in Bolivar, Pennsylvania
 WTZP-LD in Portsmouth, Ohio
 WVQS-LD in Isabel Segunda, Puerto Rico
 WVEA-TV in Tampa, Florida
 WWJE-DT in Derry, New Hampshire
 WWTI in Watertown, New York

The following stations, which are no longer licensed, formerly operated on virtual channel 50:
 KATA-CD in Mesquite, Texas
 WAGC-LD in Atlanta, Georgia

References

50 virtual TV stations in the United States